Yasunia is a genus of flowering plants in the family Lauraceae, found in Ecuador and Peru. Yasunia appears to be nested within Beilschmiedia.

Species
Currently accepted species include:

Yasunia quadrata van der Werff
Yasunia sessiliflora van der Werff

References

Lauraceae genera
Flora of western South America
Lauraceae